Jalan Rawang–Bestari Jaya (Selangor state route B27) is a major road in Selangor, Malaysia. It connects Rawang in the east to Bestari Jaya (formerly Batang Berjuntai) in the west. It is also a main route to North–South Expressway Northern Route via Rawang Interchange. The 3.1-km section of this road, which is known as Jalan Kawasan Perindustrian Rawang (from Rawang to Rawang Interchange), is also commissioned as Industrial Federal Route 3209.

List of interchanges

ROAD UPGRADING

The RM250mil Jalan Rawang-Batu Arang (B27 road) expansion is under way and will take about three years to complete.

Once completed, motorists headed to Bandar Tasik Puteri from the NKVE Rawang toll should have a smoother drive.

The 4.6 km road project will be undertaken by the state, assisted by the Public Works Department (JKR) and developers.

A total of 19 developers in the area are contributing to the B27 Road Fund, which is expected to cost RM250mil.

Phase One will stretch for 1.6 km from near the NKVE Rawang toll to the Petronas station.

Phase Two of the project, which will be done by developers, will involve building a bridge from the Petronas station to near the Shell station.

For Phase Three from the Shell station to near the Bandar Tasik Puteri junction of 2.3 km, land acquisition is being carried out by the Gombak Land office.

Roads in Selangor